The Grand Abounami is a river in western French Guiana. It is a right tributary of the Lawa (the upper course of the Maroni).

References

Rivers of French Guiana
Rivers of France